Marcel Loncin (May 20, 1920–1995) was a Belgian-born, French chemical engineer who was involved in food engineering throughout his career.

Education
Loncin was one of the first food engineers worldwide who published in the growth of the profession during his career. He studied chemical engineering at Charleroi (Belgium) and food technology at Brussels, then obtained two Ph.D's at Paris University in France.

Work experience and research
Loncin was technical director of a brewery and dairy facility in Belgium from 1942 to 1950, then was a consultant for several food companies, including Unilever and Campbell Soup. He also was a professor at the Centre d'Enseignement et de Recherches des Industries Alimentaries (CERIA) in Brussels from 1942 to 1970. From 1961 until his 1995 passing, Loncin served as scientific advisor to the Ecole Nationale Superieure des Industries Alimentaires (ENSIA). He also served as chair of the food engineering department of Karlsruhe University in West Germany (now Germany) from 1972 his retirement where Loncin was Professor Emeritus. During his career, he authored over 250 papers in his career in several languages. Loncin's research activities included drying technology and emulsion technology in foods.

Involvement with the Institute of Food Technologists
In 1993, Loncin worked with the Institute of Food Technologists (IFT) in Chicago, Illinois in the establishment of the Marcel Loncin Research Prize with the help of the IFT Foundation. This award is administered by the foundation and is awarded on even years since 1994, and is awarded to an IFT member who is a scientist or an engineer conducting basic chemistry, physics, and/or engineering research applied to food processing and food quality. This was first awarded at the 1994 Annual Meeting & Food Expo in Atlanta, Georgia with Werner Bauer of Nestle in Lausanne, Switzerland. Loncin was present at the IFT meeting to present the award to Bauer.

Additional honors
Loncin was honored by Chevreul, Thenard, ICEF, and Mehlitz during his career.

Bibliography
Loncin, M. and R.L. Merson (1979). Food engineering, principles, and selected applications. New York: Academic Press. 494p.

Notes

References
"1994 Marcel Loncin Research Prize." (1994). 1994 IFT Annual Meeting Program & Food Expo Directory. Chicago: Institute of Food Technologists. p. 83.
"1998 Marcel Loncin Research Prize." (1998). 1998 IFT Annual Meeting Program & Food Expo Directory. Chicago: Institute of Food Technologists. p. 69.
"2000 Marcel Loncin Research Prize." (2000). 2000 IFT Annual Meeting Program & Food Expo Directory. Chicago: Institute of Food Technologists. p. 28.
"2002 Marcel Loncin Research Prize." (2002). 2002 IFT Annual Meeting Program & Food Expo Directory. Chicago: Institute of Food Technologists. p. 42.
"2004 Marcel Loncin Research Prize: Dietrich Knorr." (2004). 2004 IFT Annual Meeting Program & Food Expo Directory. Chicago: Institute of Food Technologists. p. 35.
"IFT Honors Achievement Award Winners & Fellows: José Miguel Aguilera." Food Technology. August 2006. p. 62.
Mermelstein, N.H. (Executive Editor of Food Technology magazine). "RE: Review of link of Marcel Loncin in Wikipedia." E-Mail to Chris Miller. 24 Oct. 2006.
Mermelstein, N.H. "The Man Behind The Prize." Food Technology. December 2006. p. 23.

External links

IFT Marcel Loncin Research Award

1920 births
1995 deaths
Belgian chemical engineers
Belgian food engineers
Belgian food scientists
French chemical engineers
French food engineers
French food scientists
20th-century Belgian engineers
20th-century French engineers
Belgian emigrants to France